Promise is an unincorporated community in Dewey County, in the U.S. state of South Dakota.

History
A post office called Promise was established in 1911, and remained in operation until 1951. The community has the name of John Promise, a local minister.  "Promise" is an English translation of his Native American surname.

Notable people
Marcella LeBeau - Lakota nurse, military veteran, activist and politician

References

Unincorporated communities in Dewey County, South Dakota
Unincorporated communities in South Dakota